Topstep is a financial technology firm based in Chicago, IL that evaluates day traders’ performance in real-time simulated accounts. The company started as TopstepTrader, and TopstepFX (for futures and forex trading, respectively), before merging under the name Topstep in 2020 a. Traders who pass the company’s evaluation, known as the Trading Combine, earn a funded trading account and trade futures contracts in the financial markets using the firm’s capital.

History 
Topstep was started on the floor of the Chicago Board of Trade by current CEO and former Dow futures contracts floor trader, Michael Patak, and became an LLC (Limited Liability Company) in July, 2012. According to the Omaha World Herald, the name TopstepTrader was chosen because the best traders within each trading pit stand on the top step, where they have the best view and could theoretically receive the best market prices.

Products and/or services 
Topstep’s funding process consists of three steps. The first step measures the trader's profitability, while the second step evaluates the trader's risk management. After passing these two steps, the trader earns a "Funded Account", in which they can trade futures backed by Topstep's proprietary capital.

Topstep also offers an array of trader development resources including group coaching, digital coaching, blogs, podcasts, and YouTube live streams.

Topstep no longer offers Forex trading as of 2022. To focus more on the futures program, Topstep shut down its Forex trading program on April 12, 2022, and asked Forex traders to join their futures trading program instead.

Broadcasts 
Limit Up! Podcast b

Morning Forecast and Daily Recap c

Coach’s Playbook d

Awards 
Topstep has been awarded 101 Best and Brightest Companies to Work For in 2016, 2016 Chicago Innovation Awards Finalist, and 2016 FIA (Futures Industry Association) Innovator. Founder and CEO Michael Patak was a 2015 semi-finalist and 2016 finalist for the Ernst & Young Entrepreneur of the Year Award.  In 2017, Inc. Magazine ranked Topstep No. 1,261 on its 36th annual Inc. 5000.

In the news 
Topstep has appeared in news sources including Forbes, CNBC, Bloomberg, Fox Business, MarketWatch, and Built in Chicago.

References 

Financial technology companies
Futures markets
Futures exchanges